Gyrineum longicaudatum is a species of predatory sea snail, a marine gastropod mollusk in the family Cymatiidae.

Distribution
This species occurs in the Coral Sea and off New Caledonia in the Pacific.

References

External links
 Beu A.G. (1998). Résultats des Campagnes MUSORSTOM: 19. Indo-West Pacific Ranellidae, Bursidae and Personidae (Mollusca: Gastropoda), a monograph of the New Caledonian fauna and revisions of related taxa. Mémoires du Muséum National d'Histoire Naturelle. 178: 1-255

Cymatiidae
Gastropods described in 1998